This is a list of notable Fulanis.

Nigeria
Usman dan Fodio (1754-1817) – Famous Islamic scholar from Sokoto,The founder and the Spiritual leader of the Sokoto Caliphate, Nigeria.
Abdullahi dan Fodio – Former Emir of Gwandu. Scholar and brother of Usman dan Fodio, Nigeria.
Nana Asma'u – Princess, Poet, Islamic Scholar and Daughter of Usman dan Fodio, Nigeria.
Muhammed Bello (1781-1837) – Second Sultan of Sokoto in Nigeria.
Abu Bakr Atiku (1782-1842) – Third Sultan of the Sokoto Caliphate, reigning from October 1837 until November 1842. Nigeria.
Modibo Adama (1786-1847) – First Laamiɗo Fombina in Nigeria and Cameroon and small parts of Chad and Central African Republic.
Muhammad Ibn Muhammad Al-Fulani Al-Kishwani – Great African Mathematician in the Early 1700s.
Sir Abubakar Tafawa Balewa (Gere/Fulani) – Nigerian Politician and the First Prime Minister of an Independent Nigeria.
Alhaji Shehu Shagari – Former President of Nigeria.
General Murtala Mohammed – Former Head of State of Nigeria.
Umaru Musa Yar'Adua – Former President of Nigeria.
 Major-General Mohammadu Buhari – Current President and Former Head of State of Nigeria.
Major-General Shehu Musa Yar'Adua – Former Deputy Head of State, Nigeria.
Major-General Tunde Idiagbon – (Fulani/Yoruba); Former Deputy Head of State, Nigeria.
Atiku Abubakar – Former Vice President of Nigeria.
Ahmadu Bello – Sardauna of Sokoto and First Premier of Northern Region of Nigeria.
Muhammadu Junaidu – Historian, Writer.
Alhaji Gidado Idris – Former Secretary to the Government of The Federation, Nigeria.
Brigadier-General Sa'adu Abubakar – Current Sultan of Sokoto, Nigeria.
Alhaji Muhammadu Abubakar Rimi  – Former Governor of Kano State, Politician.
Rabiu Kwankwaso – Former Minister of Defence, Former Governor of Kano State, Nigeria.
Abdullahi Umar Ganduje – Current Governor of Kano State, Nigeria.
Alhaji Sule Lamido – Former Minister of Foreign Affairs, Former Governor of Jigawa State, Nigeria.
Abdullahi Aliyu Sumaila – Politician and Administrator.
Amina J. Mohammed – Politician; Deputy Secretary-General of the United Nations; Former Federal Minister of Environment, Nigeria.
Mohammed Sanusi Barkindo – Current Secretary-General of OPEC, Nigeria.
Ibrahim Gambari – Scholar and diplomat; Chief of Staff to the President; Under-Secretary-General / Special Adviser – Africa United Nations; former Minister of Foreign Affairs, Current Chief of Staff to the President of Nigeria.
Alhaji Ibrahim Kolapo Sulu Gambari – Nigerian lawyer and monarch. Current Emir of Ilorin, Nigeria.
Ibrahim Dabo – Emir of Kano (1819–46), Nigeria.
Muhammadu Dikko – Emir of Katsina (1906–44), Nigeria.
Sir Usman Nagogo – Emir of Katsina (1944–1981), Nigeria.
Muhammadu Kabir Usman – Emir of Katsina (1981–2008), Nigeria.
Abdullahi Bayero – Emir of Kano (1926–1953), Nigeria.
Muhammadu Sanusi I – Emir of Kano (1954–1963), Nigeria.
Ado Bayero – Emir of Kano (1963–2014), Nigeria.
Sanusi Lamido Sanusi – Emir of Kano, former Governor Central Bank; Nigeria.
Aliko Dangote - Billionaire businessman, Richest man in Africa
Abubakar Olusola Saraki – (Fulani/Yoruba); Former President of the Senate Second Republic, Nigeria.
Gbemisola Ruqayyah Saraki – (Fulani/Yoruba); Former Senator Kwara Central, Current Minister of State. Transportation of the Federal Republic of Nigeria. Nigeria
Bukola Saraki – (Fulani/Yoruba); Former President of the Nigerian Senate; Former Governor of Kwara State and Former Senator Kwara Central, Nigeria.
 Captain Muhammad Bala Shagari – Politician, Former Nigerian Army officer. Current Sarkin Mafaran Shagari and District Head of Shagari Local Government, Nigeria.
Bello Bala Shagari – Documentary filmmaker, a Youth Activist & Leader and the Current President of The National Youth Council of Nigeria (NYCN), Nigeria.
Sir Siddiq Abubakar III – Was a Nigerian Muslim leader. Former Sultan of Sokoto, Nigeria.
Mansur Muhtar – Economist, former Nigerian Federal Minister of Finance (2008 -2010), former director World Bank, presently vice chairman, Islamic Development Bank.
Lieutenant-General Abdulrahman Bello Dambazau – Retired Nigerian Army Lieutenant-General and Nigeria's former Minister of the Interior. Dambazau served as Chief of Army Staff (COAS) between 2008 and 2010.
Ibrahim Dasuki – Former Sultan of Sokoto, Nigeria.
Muhammadu Maccido – Former Sultan of Sokoto, Nigeria.
Rilwanu Lukman- Former Minister of Petroleum Resources and Mines, Power, Steel; and Former Secretary General OPEC.
Jubril Aminu – Former Senator of Adamawa; Pioneer Cardiac Surgeon; Former Minister of Education/Petroleum and Mineral Resources, Former President OPEC Conference.
Muhammadu Ribadu – politician, First Minister of Defense after independence, Nigeria.
Aisha Buhari – Current First Lady of Nigeria.
Nuhu Ribadu – Former Pioneer Executive Chairman of Nigeria's Economic and Financial Crimes Commission (EFCC).
Tijjani Muhammad-Bande – Political scientist, Administrator and Career Diplomat. Current President of the United Nations General Assembly, Permanent Representative of Nigeria to the UN, Former VP of the UN General Assembly.
Aliyu Modibbo Umar – Former Minister of State, Power and Steel (2002-2003), Former Minister of Commerce and Industry (2006-2007), Former Minister of Federal Capital Territory, Abuja (2007-2008).
Ahmed Suleiman – Current Emir of Misau, Bauchi State.
Mohammed Bello (jurist) – Jurist and Statesman who was the Chief Justice of Nigeria from 1987 to 1995.
 Muhammad Ali Pate – CEO GAVI; Global Director for Health, Nutrition and Population at the World Bank, Professor at Harvard Chan School; Former Minister of State for Health.
Aminu Kano – Politician and Teacher.
Nasir Ahmad el-Rufai – Current Governor of Kaduna State, Former Minister of Federal Capital.
Jelani Aliyu – Automotive Designer, Director-General of Nigeria Automotive Design and Development Council.
Abubakar Atiku Bagudu - Current Governor of Kebbi State.
Bala Mohammed – Current Governor of Bauchi State.
 Sunusi Ibrahim, Footballer
Aishatu Dahiru Ahmed- Senator Adamawa Central; APC Governatorial Candidate
Abubakar Malami- Minister of Justice and Attorney General
Aliyu Magatakarda Wamakko- The Former Governor Of Sokoto State And Current Senator Of Sokoto North.
Alhaji Mamman Shata- The Early Hausa Singer In Katsina State Nigeria Who migrate from Sanyinna Village In Sokoto to Katsina.

Guinea
Karamokho Alfa – Religious leader who led a jihad that led to the formation of Futa Jallon, Guinea
Ibrahim Sori Mawdo (The Elder) – Religious Leader and Second Almaami of Futa Jalon, Guinea
Bokar Biro – last independent Almamy of Fuuta Jalon, Resistance hero to French invasion, Guinea
Thierno Aliou – Author, Muslim theologian and politician, Guinea
Yacine Diallo – Politician. Former member of French National Assembly, Guinea
Boubacar Diallo Telli – Diplomat and Politician. First Secretary-General of the Organization of African Unity (OAU),UN Representative, Ambassador to USA, Minister of Justice, Guinea
Alpha Oumar Barry – Medical Doctor and politician, Former Minister of State for Exchange, Guinea
Ousmane Baldé – Economist and Politician. Former Governor of Guinean Fed reserve (Central bank), Former Minister of Finance. Guinea
Mamadou Boye Bah – Politician and Economist, former President of Union for the New Republic and Former President of Union of Democratic Forces of Guinea. 
Siradiou Diallo – Journalist and politician, former magazine Jeune Afrique Editor in chief, and Former President of Union for Progress and Renewal (Guinea).
Cellou Dalein Diallo – Economist and politician, Former Minister and Prime Minister; Opposition Leader, Guinea
Tierno Monénembo (real name Thierno Saidou Diallo) – novelist and biochemist, winner of the Prix Renaudot award in 2008 for his novel The King of Kahel, winner of Grand Prix de la Francophonie 2017. Guinea
Djibril Tamsir Niane – Guinean historian, playwright and short story writer
Barry Diawadou – Civil clerk and politician, Former member of the French National Assembly and Former Minister of Education. Guinea
Saifoulaye Diallo –Politician and lawmaker, Former member of the French National Assembly, Former President of the Territorial Assembly and President of the National Assembly; Former Minister of State (foreign affairs, finance, social services).
Ibrahima Barry (popularly known as Barry III) – Lawyer and politician, Former Minister from Guinea
Katoucha (Kadiatou Niane) – former model and fashion designer, Guinea
Boubacar Yacine Diallo – Journalist, Writer, Former Minister of Communication, Former Chairman of the National Council of Communication, Current Vice president of the independent national institution for human rights in Guinea. 
Addi Bâ or Bah Mamadou Hady – called by the Germans "black terrorist" ("Der schwarze Terrorist"), a figure of the French resistance, member of the first scrub of the Vosges, Guinea
Aïcha Bah Diallo – Former Minister of Education and Women's Rights Activist, Former Senior education leader at UNESCO. 
Hamidou Diallo – American professional basketball player. 2019 NBA All-Star Slam Dunk Contest winner
Rabiatou Sérah Diallo – Guinean trade unionist. Former president of the National Transitional Council. Current President of Economic and Social Council, Guinea
Black M (Alpha Diallo) – French rapper and Singer–Songwriter.
General Souleymane Kelefa Diallo- Former Guinean army chief of staff
Mohamed Béavogui (Loma/Fulani)- Prime Minister of Guinea
 Mohamed Bayo - soccer player
 Pablo Thiam - soccer player
 Yadaly Diaby - soccer player
 Boubacar Barry - German football player

Senegal and Mauritania
El Hadj Umar Tall (1797–1864) – religious leader from the Tijani Sufi Order from Senegal. Founder of the Toucouleur Empire
Ahmadou Tall (1836–1897) – Second Sultan of the Toucouleur Empire
Sulayman Bal (1726–1776) – Islamic scholar and war commander from the Futa Toro in Senegal
 Macky Sall – Current President of Senegal; Chairman of the African Union
Abdoulaye Baldé (politician)- Politician, Former Secretary-General of the Presidency, Mayor of Ziguinchor, Senegal
Abdourahmane Sow- Politician, Former Minister and Former Vice-President of the National Assembly Senegal.
Ahmadou Bamba Ba – Religious leader, Senegal
Aïssata Kane – former Mauritanian politician who was the country's first female government minister and women's rights activist.
Amadou Ba- Politician. Current Prime Minister, former Minister of Foreign Affairs, Former Minister of Economy and Finance, Senegal
Amsatou Sow Sidibé- academic, lawyer and politician, Senegal
Ba Mamadou Mbare – former President of the Senate of Mauritania and former acting President of Mauritania, in office 15 April 2009 – 5 August 2009. The first black leader of Mauritania
Baaba Maal – Singer and guitarist – Senegal
Cheikh Tidiane Gadio - Diplomat, former Minister of State, Minister of Foreign Affairs, Senegal
Cherif Mohamed Aly Aidara - Shi'i religious leader, NGO founder, and international development leader
Daouda Sow (politician)- Politician and legislator, Former Minister and Former President of the National Assembly, Senegal
Djibo Leyti Kâ – Held Multiple Ministerial Positions Including, Foreign Affairs, National Education, Interior, Communication etc. Senegal
Ibrahima Diallo (politician) – politician who served in the French Senate from 1956 to 1958
Khadidiatou Diallo- Activist, Senegal
Maba Diakhou Ba – Religious leader, Nioro Senegal
Mamadou Dia – Member of French Senate from 1948 to 1956 and the French National Assembly from 1956 to 1958. First Prime Minister of Senegal (1957–62), Senegal
Omar Sy – French actor and comedian
Ousmane Sow – sculptor, Senegal
General Mountaga Diallo- Former Force Commander of MONUC, Former diplomat, Senegal
Aïssata Tall Sall- Minister of Foreign Affairs; Senegal
 Abdoulkader Thiam
 Abdallahi Mahmoud
 Aly Abeid— Football Player; Mauritania 
 Houssen Abderrahmane
 Ibrahim Ba
 Issa Ba
 Issiar Dia
 Mohamed Dellahi Yali
Moussa Sow- Football Player
Aïssata Tall Sall - Minister of Foreign Affairs, Senegal
 Abdou Diallo - Senegalese professional footballer who plays for RB Leipzig.
 Kalidou Koulibaly - Senegalese professional footballer who plays for Chelsea.
 Bambo Diaby
 El Hadji Ba
 Lamine Ba
 Hassan Houbeib
 Demba Ba
 Papa Malick Ba
 Mohamed Saqr

Mali
Adame Ba Konaré – Historian, writer, and former First Lady of Mali (wife of president Alpha Oumar Konaré)
 Bah Mamadou
 Cheick Oumar Dabo
 Demba Barry, footballer
 Lassana Diallo
Modibo Mohammed Al Kaburi – 15th century scholar who immigrated from Kabara to Timbuktu. He established the curriculum at Sankore University that produced many esteemed scholars, he taught both Umar ibn Muhammad Aqit, and Sidi Yahya.
Sékou Amadou (1775–1846) – Founder and First Shaykh of the Maasina Empire in 1817.
Baréma Bocoum – Politician and diplomat. Former Foreign Minister of Mali and former member of French National Assembly. Mali. 
Mahmoud Dicko– Imam Sunnite, Mali
Amadou Hampâté Bâ – Writer and ethnologist, Mali
Abdoulaye Sékou Sow – Former Prime Minister, Mali
Madina Ly-Tall – Historian and diplomat, Mali
Oumar Tatam Ly – Former Prime Minister, Mali
 – Former Minister, Former Administrator of Organisation internationale de la Francophonie (OIF), Mali
Alpha Oumar Konaré, former president of the republic (Fulani mother), Mali
Mountaga Tall– Politician. Former Minister, Former First Vice-President of the National Assembly of Mali
Cheick Diallo– NBA Basketball player. Former New Orleans Pelicans player, Current Phoenix Suns player. USA, Mali
Boubou Cisse- Politician and economist. Former Prime Minister and Minister of Economy and Finance; Former Minister of Industry and Mines; Mali.
Sidibé Aminata Diallo – Malian Academic and politician. Former Minister of Basic Education, Literacy, and the National Languages. Mali
Ousmane Sy - Politician. Former Minister of Territorial Administration and Local Communities ; Mali.
Sy Kadiatou Sow– Politician and Women's Rights Activist, Former governor of Bamako district, the first woman to hold the position in Mali, Former Minister of Foreign Affairs, Foreign Malians and African Integration and Former Minister of Urban Planning and Habitat. Mali
Sangaré Niamoto Ba- Politician, Former Ministry of Industry, Investment and Commerce
Inna Modja - Singer, songwriter and activist
 Moussa Diaby
Moctar Ouane- Diplomat and Politician. Prime Minister; Former Minister of Foreign Affairs; Former Ambassador to the United Nations.
Aminata Dicko– Human rights activist.

Burkina Faso
Thomas Sankara (Mossi-Fulani)- Former President
Hama Arba Diallo – Politician, diplomat and civil servant Former Minister of Foreign Affairs, Former Vice-President of the National Assembly, Burkina Faso
Salif Diallo – Former President of National Assembly; Former Minister of Environment and Water, Former Minister of Agriculture, Burkina Faso
Benewende Stanislas Sankara – First Vice-President of the National Assembly, Burkina Faso
Yéro Boly – Administrator, Diplomat and Politician, Former Minister of Territorial Administration and Security, Former Director of the Cabinet of the President and Former Minister of Defense ; Burkina Faso
Chérif Sy – journalist, politician, Former President of the National Transitional Council of Burkina Faso, former acting President of Burkina Faso (17 September 2015 – 23 September 2015). Current Minister of defense; Burkina Faso
Alpha Barry – Journalist, Current Minister of Foreign Affairs; Burkina Faso
Aminata Diallo Glez – Filmmaker, Actress and producer, Burkina Faso
Boubacar Diallo (filmmaker) – Journalist, Filmmaker, Burkina Faso
Sékou Ba – Politician, Former Minister of Animal Resources , Burkina Faso

Cameroon
Modibbo Adama – Islamic Scholar and first emir of Adamawa (Both Cameroon and Nigerian Adamawa)
Ahmadou Ahidjo – First President, Cameroon (1960–1982)
Bello Bouba Maigari – Former Prime Minister, Cameroon
Sadou Hayatou – Former Prime Minister, Cameroon
Issa Hayatou – Former President of the Confederation of African Football (CAF), Former Acting President FIFA, Cameroon
Oumarou Fadil – Businessman, Vice President of Group Fadil (an agro-industrial group which operates in several sectors including soap, oil extraction, tourism, livestock, and new information technologies), Cameroon
Djaili Amadou Amal – Writer and feminist activist, Cameroon
Goggo Addi – Storyteller who worked to preserve Fulani cultural heritage
Souleymanou Hamidou
Germaine Ahidjo - Former First Lady, Cameroon (1960-1982)

Sierra Leone
Alimamy Rassin - was a Fula chief who devoted his life to making peace among his people and fellow rulers. Sierra Leone
Amadu Wurie - Educationist and politician, First Minister of Education and later Minister of Interior of Sierra Leone
Sir Banja Tejan-Sie - Politician and lawyer. Former Vice President under SLPP (1953-1956), Former Chief Justice and Governor-General of Sierra Leone
Mohamed Juldeh Jalloh – Current Vice President, Republic of Sierra Leone
Abass Bundu – Current Speaker of Parliament Sierra Leone, Former Minister of Foreign Affairs, Former Executive Secretary of the Economic Community of West African States
Ibrahim Bundu - Former majority leader of the Sierra Leone Parliament, Sierra Leone
Abdulai Hamid Charm - Former Chief Justice, Sierra Leone
Umu Hawa Tejan-Jalloh – Former Chief Justice, Diplomat, Sierra Leone
Sulaiman Tejan-Jalloh – politician and Diplomat, Former Minister of Transport and Communications and Former Ambassador to US, Sierra Leone
Neneh Cherry (birth name Neneh Mariann Karlsson) – Singer-songwriter, rapper, occasional DJ and broadcaster, Sweden
Titiyo (birth name Titiyo Yambalu Felicia Jah) – singer and songwriter, Sweden
Alpha Timbo – Politician, educationist, lecturer and trade unionist. Minister of Primary and Secondary Education, Former Minister of Labor and Industrialization, Sierra Leone
Chernor Maju Bah – lawyer and politician. Leader of Majority party/Opposition Leader in parliament, Former Running Mate for APC, Former Deputy Speaker of Parliament of Sierra Leone; Former Chairman of the Mines and Minerals Resources Committee. Sierra Leone.
Alhaji Lamrana Bah – Businessman, Sierra Leone
Abubakarr Jalloh – Politician, Former Minister of Mineral Resource, Sierra Leone
Amadu Jalloh – Politician, Sierra Leone
Minkailu Bah – politician and Lecturer, Former Minister of Education, Youth and Sports, Sierra Leone
Mariama Jalloh Singer–Songwriter, Sierra Leone, Germany
Mohamed Bailor Barrie was a prominent businessman in Sierra Leone's diamond trade in the 70s and 80s
Hardy Caprio- Real name Hardy Tayyib-Bah, is a British Singer, Songwriter and Record Producer
 Fankaty Dabo
 Idris Kanu, Footballer
 Mohamed Kanu

Gambia
Adama Barrow – Politician and real estate developer. Current President, Republic of the Gambia
Isatou Njie-Saidy – Politician. Former Vice President, Former secretary of state Social Welfare, Health and Women's Affair, Republic of the Gambia
Fatoumata Tambajang – Politician and Activist. Former Vice President, Former Minister of Women's Affair, Republic of the Gambia
Hassan Bubacar Jallow – Judge. Chief Justice of the Gambia since February 2017, Former Prosecutor of the International Criminal Tribunal for Rwanda (ICTR), Former Prosecutor of the Mechanism for International Criminal Tribunals, Former Justice of the Supreme Court of the Gambia, Former Minister of Justice-Attorney General of the Gambia and Former Solicitor General of the Gambia.
Cherno Jallow – Lawyer and Judge. Justice of the Supreme Court of the Gambia, Former Attorney General of the British Virgin Islands, Gambia
Hamat Bah – Politician. Current Minister of Tourism and Culture; leader of the National Reconciliation Party (NRP), Gambia
Omar A. Jallow – Politician. Former Minister of Agriculture, leader of the People's Progressive Party, Gambia
Halifa Sallah – Former Special Advisor to the President on Governance and the spokesperson for President Adama Barrow's administration, Former National Assembly Minority Leader, Secretary-general of the People's Democratic Organisation for Independence and Socialism, Gambia
Mama Kandeh- leader opposition Gambia Democratic Congress, and former parliamentarian
Haddy Jallow- actress, Gambia.
Buba Baldeh- former Minister for Youth Sports and Culture Under the PPP Regime. He is the son of the Late Micheal Baldeh who was a member of Parliament in the first Republic.
 Samuel Kargbo- Football Player
 Musa Barrow- Football player
 Musa Juwara

Guinea Bissau
Manuel Serifo Nhamadjo – Former Interim President and Former acting President of the National People's Assembly
Brigadier-General Umaro Sissoco Embaló – President of Guinea-Bissau, Former Prime Minister and Minister of African Affairs.
Adiato Djaló Nandigna – Current Minister of Fisheries; Former Acting Prime Minister, Former Minister of Culture, Youth and Sports and Former Minister of Defense, Guinea Bissau
Baciro Djá – Former Prime Minister, Former Minister of National Defense and Former Minister of Youth and Sport, Guinea Bissau
Eloïne Barry – communications professional and founder of African Media Agency. France, Guinea Bissau
Fatumata Djau Baldé – Current Minister of Public Administration and State Modernization;  Former Minister of Foreign Affairs, Guinea Bissau
Umaro Djau - International journalist and aspiring political figure
Mamadú Iaia Djaló – Current Minister of Trade and Industry, Guinea Bissau
 Tiago Djaló
Yannick Djaló
Amilcar Só – Academic in language and culture; Rubik's cube cube top 50 world champion; Statistics and computer analyst for NASA

Niger, Chad, CAR and Sudan
Amadou Boubacar Cissé – Politician, Former Prime Minister, Former Minister of State for Planning, Regional Development, and Community Development, Niger
Mamadou Tandja (Fula/Soninke)- Former President, Niger
Hama Amadou – Politician, Former Prime Minister and President of the National Assembly of Niger
Amadou Cheiffou – Politician. Former Prime Minister, Niger
Albadé Abouba – Politician. Former acting Prime Minister, Current Minister of State, Minister of Agriculture and Livestock. Niger
Aissa Diori - Former First Lady, Niger
Ide Oumarou - diplomat, government minister, and journalist, Former Secretary-general of the Organization of African Unity
Abdel Kader Baba-Laddé (or General Baba Laddé or Mahamat Abdoul Kadre) – Politician, Chad
Hindou Oumarou Ibrahim- Environmental activist and geographer. Coordinator Association of Peul Women and Autochthonous People of Chad (AFPAT) and Co-director Pavilion of World Indigenous People, Chad
Ali Darassa – Leader of the Central African rebel group, the Union for Peace in the Central African Republic (UPC) a self-defense force.
Al-Amin Abu-Manga, linguist and professor at the University of Khartoum
 Ali Mohamed
 Issah Salou
 Jules Hamidou
 Hassan Diallo

Ghana, Togo, Ivory Coast, Somalia and Tanzania
Mohamed Ibn Chambas - lawyer, diplomat, politician and academic. Special Representative of the Secretary-General and Head of the United Nations Office for West Africa (UNOWA); First Executive Secretary of ECOWAS, Former Deputy Foreign Secretary and Deputy Minister of Education, Ghana
Ahmed Ramadan - politician and former chairman of People's National Convention (PNC). Father of Second Lady of Ghana
 Mario Barwuah
Samira Bawumia - Politician, Second Lady of Ghana
Mohammed Adamu Ramadan - Politician and member of the NDC
Barry Moussa Barqué - Politician held multiple ministerial position including: Mines, Energy, Foreign Affairs, Finance Etc., Current Special Adviser to the President with the rank of Minister. Togo
Khady Diallo - cultural engineer. Former Ivorian cultural attache in Paris. General Secretary of the National Commission of the Francophonie in Côte d'Ivoire, Ivory Coast 
Boubacar Barry - retired Ivorian football goalkeeper. Goalkeeping coach at Oud-Heverlee Leuven- Belgium. Ivory Coast
 Mohamed Abdullahi Mohamed
Anthony Diallo – politician, Former Minister of National Resources and Tourism, Former Member of the Tanzanian Parliament, Tanzania
Amad Diallo - professional Footballer, plays for Manchester United; Ivory Coast
 Liban Abdulahi
 Nazr Mohammed, Basketball player
 Abou Diaby
 Mohammed Diomande
 Abdul Razak
 Ismaël Diallo
 Moustapha Salifou

Canada, United States of America 
Abdul Rahman Ibrahima Sori (c. 1762 – 1829) – Son of Ibrahim Sori Mawdo of Futa-Jallon. Enslaved in Natchez, Mississippi but freed and repatriated to Liberia.
Alhaji Mohammed
Ayuba Suleiman Diallo (also known as Job ben Solomon) – Trader, then slave. Freed and repatriated to his homeland in Boundou, Senegal
Bilali Mohammet, a West African (Futa-Jallon) enslaved on Sapelo Island, Georgia, author of the Bilali Document
Bill Hamid
Elladj Baldé - Canadian figure skater. He won the 2015 Nebelhorn Trophy, an ISU Challenger Series event. He is the 2008 Canadian Junior champion.
Hamidou Diallo- American professional basketball player for the Oklahoma City Thunder of the National Basketball Association (NBA)
Ira Frederick Aldridge – stage actor, claims to have descended from the Fulani princely line, USA
Omar Ibn Said (c. 1770 – 1864) – Islamic scholar from Futa-Toro. Taken as a slave to Charleston, South Carolina in 1807. Escaped to North Carolina, Wrote a slave narrative in Arabic professing his Islamic faith. Died before end of Civil War. 
Richard Pierpoint - Slave, freed slave, British Army soldier and farmer in Fergus, Ontario Canada.
Yarrow Mamout (or Mahmoud or Mamood or Muhammad Yaro) – was a former slave, entrepreneur, and property owner in Georgetown, Washington, DC, USA

References

 
Lists of people by ethnicity